Isiro-Ville Airport  was an airport serving Isiro, Democratic Republic of the Congo. Isiro is now served by Matari Airport.

See also

Transport in the Democratic Republic of the Congo
List of airports in the Democratic Republic of the Congo

References

Defunct airports
Isiro